HMS Sorceress was an  destroyer which served with the Royal Navy during World War I. Launched on 29 August 1916, the vessel operated as part of the Grand Fleet until it was disbanded in 1919. In 1917, the ship took part in action against the German Sixth Destroyer Flotilla and was one of those credited with bounty for the German auxiliary cruiser Konprinz Willhelm. The destroyer was sold to be broken up on 29 April 1927.

Design and development

Sorceress was one of seventeen  destroyers ordered by the British Admiralty in July 1915 as part of the Sixth War Construction Programme. The design was generally similar to the preceding M class, but differed in having geared steam turbines, a different location for the central gun and minor changes to improve seakeeping.

Three funnels were fitted.

Armament consisted of three  Mk IV QF guns on the ship's centreline, with one on the forecastle, one aft on a raised platform and one between the second and third funnels. A single 2-pounder (40 mm) pom-pom anti-aircraft gun was carried, while torpedo armament consisted of two twin rotating torpedo tubes for  torpedoes. The ship had a complement of 82 officers and ratings.

Construction and career
Sorceress was laid down by Swan Hunter & Wigham Richardson at Wallsend on the River Tyne on 13 November 1915 and given the yard number 1013. The destroyer was launched on 29 August 1916 and completed on 4 December.

On commissioning, Sorceress joined the Fifteenth Destroyer Flotilla of the Grand Fleet. Sorceress took a minor part in the action, which ended with the sinking of the destroyer . On 12 February 1917, four German large torpedo boats attacked the regular convoy between Britain and Norway, overwhelming the escort of two destroyers ( and ) and four naval trawlers. All the escort except Pellew were sunk, as were all six merchant ships. Sorceress picked up three survivors from one of the trawlers, later that day.

After the Grand Fleet was disbanded, the ship was recommissioned on 19 November 1919. In 1923, the Royal Navy decided to scrap many of the older destroyers in preparation for the introduction of newer and larger vessels. Sorceress was decommissioned and sold to Thos. W. Ward of Sheffield to be broken up on 29 April 1927.

Pennant numbers

References

Bibliography

 
 
 
 
 
 
 
 
 
 
 
 
 

1916 ships
R-class destroyers (1916)
Ships built on the River Tyne
World War I destroyers of the United Kingdom